The 1988 North Dakota State football team represented North Dakota State University during the 1988 NCAA Division II football season, and completed the 92nd season of Bison football. The Bison played their home games at Dacotah Field in Fargo, North Dakota. The 1988 team came off a 6–4 record from the previous season. The team was led by coach Rocky Hager. The team finished the regular season with an undefeated 10–0 record and made the NCAA Division II playoffs.

Schedule

References

North Dakota State Bison football seasons
North Dakota State
NCAA Division II Football Champions
North Central Conference football champion seasons
College football undefeated seasons
North Dakota State Bison football